P. flavescens may refer to:

 Pantala flavescens, the most widespread dragonfly
 Pappophorum flavescens, a pappus grass
 Paracles flavescens, a Brazilian moth
 Paraclione flavescens, a sea angel
 Paradelphomyia flavescens, a crane fly
 Parapercis flavescens, a bony fish
 Paraxanthias flavescens, a mud crab
 Parazuphium flavescens, a ground beetle
 Parsonsia flavescens, a woody vine
 Pelias flavescens, a venomous viper
 Penstemon flavescens, a flowering plant
 Pentanychus flavescens, a daddy longlegs
 Peperomia flavescens, a radiator plant
 Perca flavescens, a freshwater fish
 Pergularia flavescens, a perennial herb
 Perognathus flavescens, a North American rodent
 Peyssonnelia flavescens, a red algae
 Peziza flavescens, an apothecial fungus
 Phalera flavescens, an Asian moth
 Phaseolus flavescens, a wild bean
 Phiale flavescens, a jumping spider
 Phoradendron flavescens, a mistletoe native to the Americas
 Phragmatobia flavescens, a South American moth
 Phryneta flavescens, a flat-faced longhorn beetle
 Pipistrellus flavescens, a vesper bat
 Plagiometriona flavescens, a leaf beetle
 Plastingia flavescens, a skipper butterfly
 Pleiocarpa flavescens, a plant with fragrant flowers
 Plexippoides flavescens, a jumping spider
 Plutodes flavescens, a geometer moth
 Poecilopeplus flavescens, a longhorn beetle
 Pogonognathellus flavescens, a hexapod with internal mouthparts
 Procanace flavescens, a beach fly
 Promalactis flavescens, a Chinese moth
 Psaltoda flavescens, a cicada native to Queensland
 Pseudauchenipterus flavescens, a driftwood catfish
 Pseudomonas flavescens, a Gram-negative bacterium
 Psilopa flavescens, a shore fly
 Pterandra flavescens, a flowering plant
 Puccinia flavescens, a plant pathogen
 Pulvinaria flavescens, a scale insect
 Pycnonotus flavescens, an Asian songbird
 Pycreus flavescens, a papyrus sedge